is a Japanese pianist and composer.

Itabashi began playing piano when he was eight years old, and studied music formally at Kunitachi College of Music, where he first started playing jazz. In the 1970s he worked with Terumasa Hino, Takeo Moriyama, and Sadao Watanabe, in addition to leading his own small ensembles. In the 1980s he did several international tours as a sideman with Ray Anderson and Elvin Jones, and in the 1990s worked with Leo Etoh in a traditional Japanese percussion ensemble called Wa Daiko.

In addition to his work in jazz, Itabashi also works as a film score composer, and has done soundtracks for Chinese and Japanese motion pictures.

References
Kazunori Sugiyama, "Fumio Itabashi". The New Grove Dictionary of Jazz. 2nd edition, ed. Barry Kernfeld.

1949 births
People from Tochigi, Tochigi
Musicians from Tochigi Prefecture
Kunitachi College of Music alumni
21st-century Japanese male musicians
21st-century Japanese pianists
Japanese jazz composers
Japanese jazz pianists
Japanese male pianists
Living people
Male jazz composers
Male jazz pianists